The 2018–19 Coupe de France preliminary rounds, Hauts-de France was the qualifying competition to decide which teams from the leagues of the Hauts-de France region of France took part in the main competition from the seventh round.

Preliminary round 
These matches are from the Aisne district only, and were played on 19 August 2018.
  

These matches are from the Artois district only, and were played on 19 August 2018.

This match is from the Flandres district only, and was played on 26 August 2018.

First round 
These matches are from the Somme district only, and were played on 17, 23 and 24 June 2018. Tiers shown reflect the 2017–18 season.
  

These matches are from the Aisne district only, and were played on 26 August 2018.
  

These matches are from the Côte d'Opale district only, and were played on 26 August 2018.
  

These matches are from the Flandres district only, and were played on 26 and 29 August and 2 September 2018.
  

These matches are from the Artois district only, and were played on 26 and 29 August 2018 (with one match replayed on 2 September 2018).
  

These matches are from the Escaut district only, and were played on 26 and 30 August 2018.
  

These matches are from the Oise district only, and were played on 26 August 2018.

Second to third round framing 
The Escaut district required a framing round, to reduce the number of teams going forwards to the third round from 44 to 43.
This match was played on 8 September 2018.

Third round 
These matches were played on 15 and 16 September 2018.

Fourth round 
These matches were played on 28, 29 and 30 September 2018.

Fifth round 
These matches were played on 13 and 14 October 2018.

Sixth round 
These matches were played on 27 and 28 October 2018.

References 

2018–19 Coupe de France